Jack Kirk (February 19, 1895 – September 13, 1948) was an American film actor from Missoula, Montana who had roles in over 300 films, mostly B-westerns, from 1926 and 1954.

Selected filmography

 The Stolen Ranch (1926)
 Dames Ahoy! (1930)
 The Lone Rider (1930)
 Law of the Rio Grande (1931)
 Border Law (1931)
 Riders of the Rio (1931)
 The Fighting Fool (1932)
 Texas Cyclone (1932)
 The Saddle Buster (1932)
 Mark of the Spur (1932)
 Ghost Valley (1932)
 The Western Code (1932)
 Unknown Valley (1933)
 Fighting Through (1934)
 Outlaw Rule (1935)
 The Man From Guntown (1935)
 The Rider of the Law (1935)
 Lawless Range (1935)
 Comin' Round the Mountain (1936)
 California Mail (1936)
 Guns of the Pecos (1937)
 State Police (1938)
 Outlaw Express (1938)
 Rhythm of the Saddle (1938)
 Gold Mine in the Sky (1938)
 The Night Riders (1939)
 Lone Star Raiders (1940)
 The Trail Blazers (1940)
 The Tulsa Kid (1940)
 Bad Man of Deadwood (1941)
 Man from Cheyenne (1942)
 Westward Ho (1942)
 Sheriff of Sundown (1944)
 Cheyenne Wildcat (1944)
 Corpus Christi Bandits (1945)
 The Topeka Terror (1945)
 Conquest of Cheyenne (1946)
 Gunning for Vengeance (1946)
 Terrors on Horseback (1946)
 Oregon Trail Scouts (1947)
 The Bold Frontiersman (1948)
 Oklahoma Badlands (1948)

References

External links

1895 births
1948 deaths
Male Western (genre) film actors
Male actors from Montana
American male film actors
20th-century American male actors
People from Missoula, Montana